The Journal of Indian Society of Pedodontics and Preventive Dentistry is a quarterly peer-reviewed open access medical journal published by Medknow Publications on behalf of the Indian Society of Pedodontics and Preventive Dentistry. The journal covers research in pediatric dentistry, preventive and community dentistry, oral pathology, and dentofacial orthopedics.

Abstracting and indexing
The journal is abstracted and indexed in:
Abstracts on Hygiene and Communicable Diseases
CAB Abstracts
EBSCO databases
EmCare
Expanded Academic ASAP
MEDLINE/Index Medicus
Scopus

External links

Open access journals
Quarterly journals
English-language journals
Dentistry journals
Medknow Publications academic journals
Publications established in 1983